Radio Ritam Sarajevo is a Bosnian commercial radio station, broadcasting from Sarajevo. The same FM frequencies once were used by the local Radio Hayat from Pazarić, near Sarajevo. Since September 2013, after purchase, a new Radio format and name is presented as a result of joining the newly formed Soundset national radio group in Bosnia and Herzegovina.

Since mid-2015, Radio Ritam Sarajevo has become part of the new Radio Ritam group. Sister radio stations are: Radio Ritam Banja Luka, Radio Ritam Zenica, Radio Ritam Visoko and Radio Ritam Mostar.

See also 
List of radio stations in Bosnia and Herzegovina

References

External links 
 
 Communications Regulatory Agency of Bosnia and Herzegovina 

Sarajevo
Radio stations established in 2013
Mass media in Sarajevo